Eureka, also known as Geiberson, is an unincorporated community in Lawrence County, Indiana, in the United States.

Eureka was founded in the early 19th century near the site of the Geiberson Stone Quarry. The Shiloh Church was built at this location sometime before 1840.

References

Unincorporated communities in Lawrence County, Indiana
Unincorporated communities in Indiana